Euonymus pallidifolius is an ornamental shrub in the family Celastraceae. It is endemic to Taiwan.  It is threatened by habitat loss and considered critically endangered.  Euonymus pallidifolia grows in evergreen forests on raised coral reefs. The plant's entire remaining habitat is located in the Kenting National Park in Taiwan.

References

Flora of Taiwan
pallidifolius
Critically endangered plants
Taxonomy articles created by Polbot
Taxobox binomials not recognized by IUCN